New Castle-Henry County Municipal Airport  is a public use airport located four nautical miles (5 mi, 7 km) southeast of the central business district of New Castle, a city in Henry County, Indiana, United States. It is included in the National Plan of Integrated Airport Systems for 2011–2015, which categorized it as a general aviation facility.

Although most U.S. airports use the same three-letter location identifier for the FAA and IATA, this airport is assigned UWL by the FAA but has no designation from the IATA.

Facilities and aircraft 
New Castle-Henry County Municipal Airport covers an area of 32 acres (13 ha) at an elevation of 1,088 feet (332 m) above mean sea level. It has one runway designated 9/27 with an asphalt surface measuring 4,000 by 65 feet (1,219 x 20 m).

For the 12-month period ending December 31, 2009, the airport had 5,854 aircraft operations, an average of 16 per day: 96% general aviation and 4% air taxi. At that time there were 24 aircraft based at this airport: 79% single-engine, 17% multi-engine, and 4% ultralight.

References

External links 
 Airport page at City of New Castle website
 
 Aerial image as of March 1998 from USGS The National Map
 
 

Airports in Indiana
Transportation in Henry County, Indiana